

Noraly Beyer (born 20 July 1946) is a Dutch former presenter. From 1983 to 2008 she was a news presenter of Radio Netherlands Worldwide Beyer was a news presenter of the Dutch public news broadcaster NOS Journaal from 1985 to 2008 .

See also
 List of news presenters

References

External links
 

1946 births
Living people
People from Willemstad
Dutch television presenters
Dutch television news presenters
Dutch radio presenters
Dutch women radio presenters
Dutch journalists
Dutch radio journalists
Dutch women journalists
20th-century Dutch women
20th-century Dutch people